Sławomir Majak (born 12 January 1969) is a Polish football manager and former footballer. He was most recently in charge of II liga side Siarka Tarnobrzeg.

References

1969 births
Living people
People from Radomsko County
Sportspeople from Łódź Voivodeship
Association football midfielders
Association football forwards
Polish footballers
Poland international footballers
Polish expatriate footballers
ŁKS Łódź players
MD FF Köping players
Zagłębie Lubin players
Hannover 96 players
Widzew Łódź players
FC Hansa Rostock players
Anorthosis Famagusta F.C. players
RKS Radomsko players
Ekstraklasa players
Bundesliga players
2. Bundesliga players
Cypriot First Division players
Polish expatriate sportspeople in Germany
Expatriate footballers in Germany
Polish expatriate sportspeople in Cyprus
Expatriate footballers in Cyprus
Polish football managers
II liga managers
Olimpia Zambrów managers
KSZO Ostrowiec Świętokrzyski managers